Echinobothriidae is a family of flatworms belonging to the order Diphyllidea.

Genera:
 Ahamulina Marques, Jensen & Caira, 2012
 Andocadoncum Abbott & Caira, 2014
 Coronocestus Caira, Marques, Jensen, Kuchta & Ivanov, 2013
 Ditrachybothridium Rees, 1959
 Echinobothrium Van Beneden, 1849
 Halysioncum Caira, Marques, Jensen, Kuchta & Ivanov, 2013

References

Platyhelminthes